KBUN-FM (104.5 FM, "Sports Radio FM 104.5 The Fan") is a sports radio station based in Bemidji, Minnesota, licensed to nearby Blackduck, Minnesota.  It is owned by Hubbard Broadcasting, Inc. The Bemidji studios are located at 502 Beltrami Avenue, downtown Bemidji. The transmitter site is north of Lake Bemidji on Sumac Road.

The station signed on May 1, 2008 as WQXJ, as the newest station to Omni Broadcasting's Paul Bunyan Broadcasting group. Originally, it was an affiliate of The True Oldies Channel. It later derived most of its programming from Westwood One's Classic Hits.

KBUN-FM is the local home to the Minnesota Twins broadcasts, along with its sister station KBUN.

Hubbard Broadcasting announced on November 13, 2014 that it would purchase the Omni Broadcasting stations, including WQXJ. The sale was completed on February 27, 2015, at a purchase price of $8 million for the 16 stations and one translator.

On October 26, 2015, WQXJ changed its program format to sports, branded as "Sports Radio FM 104.5 The Fan" under new call letters, KBUN-FM.

References

External links

Radio stations in Minnesota
Sports radio stations in the United States
Radio stations established in 2008
Hubbard Broadcasting